Parmys (Old Persian (H)uparviyā, Elamite Uparmiya) was a Persian princess, the only daughter of Bardiya (Smerdis), son of Cyrus the Great. She was the granddaughter of Cyrus the Great, and Cassandane.

When Darius the Great (Darius I) seized the Achaemenid throne, he married two daughters (Atossa and Artystone) of Cyrus the Great and later on his granddaughter (Parmys). Parmys bore him a son called Ariomardus.

References

Sources
Herodotus, III, 88; VII, 78
Persepolis Fortification Tablets (where she is called Uparmiya)
Brosius, M: Women in Ancient Persia, 559-331 BC, Clarendon Press, Oxford, 1998.
Lendering, J: "Parmys", in http://www.livius.org
Persepolis Fortification Archive Project

6th-century BC births
5th-century BC deaths
6th-century BC women
5th-century BC women
Queens of the Achaemenid Empire
6th-century BC Iranian people
5th-century BC Iranian people
Achaemenid princesses
Family of Darius the Great